Windy Gully is an ice-filled gully between New Mountain and Terra Cotta Mountain, on the south side of Taylor Glacier in Victoria Land. Named by the Western Journey Party, led by Taylor, of the British Antarctic Expedition, 1910–13. All parties in this area have commented on the incidence of high winds here.

Valleys of Victoria Land
McMurdo Dry Valleys